Perot Field Fort Worth Alliance Airport  is a public airport  north of the central business district of Fort Worth, Texas, United States. The airport is owned by the City of Fort Worth and managed by Alliance Air Services, a subsidiary of Hillwood Development, and is, in size, the second-largest airport facility in North Texas, behind only Dallas/Fort Worth International Airport (DFW).

The airport is mainly focused on cargo operations, and serves as a southern regional hub for FedEx Express and focus city for Amazon Air. It provides no major commercial passenger airline service, though it does provide general aviation services. It formerly served as a maintenance hub for Fort Worth-based American Airlines, until the bankruptcy filing and subsequent restructuring of its parent AMR Corporation.

History
Billed as the world's first purely industrial airport, it was developed in a joint venture between the City of Fort Worth, the Federal Aviation Administration and the Hillwood Development Company, a real estate development company owned by Ross Perot Jr.

Alliance Airport was an occasional source of friction between the cities of Dallas and Fort Worth prior to the repeal of Wright Amendment, which imposed long-distance flight restrictions at Dallas Love Field after non-compete clauses in the 1968 DFW Concurrent Bond Ordinance signed by Dallas and Fort Worth failed to stop Southwest Airlines from beginning service from Love. The bond agreement prohibited both cities from offering municipal airport services that are "potentially competitive" with DFW. Fort Worth officials long asserted that, unlike Love Field, Alliance is not a direct competitor to DFW as no attempt was ever made to initiate passenger service there and the FedEx and American Airlines bases would never have been located at DFW, instead.

In the early 1990s, factions in Dallas were calling for Wright Amendment restrictions to be lifted to enhance local airline service. On , Dallas city leaders threatened to block a proposed  million expansion of Alliance, accusing Fort Worth leaders of undermining support for other local airport projects; Dallas councilman Jerry Bartos, an influential repeal proponent, was accused of trying to make Alliance a negotiating point in his campaign to repeal the Wright Amendment. On February 25, Dallas leaders dropped their objections when it became clear that the planned expansion would not jeopardize federal funding for other local airport projects. On April 8, the city of Fort Worth sued the City of Dallas, accusing Dallas leaders of violating the non-compete clause by scheduling a City Council vote on the Wright Amendment.

In 1993, Russian flag carrier Aeroflot proposed opening a cargo base at Alliance as part of a proposed joint venture with the Perots to expand cargo operations at three airports in Russia. On , a group of Russian officials negotiating for the proposal arrived at Alliance in an Ilyushin Il-96, the first U.S. visit by the new passenger jet.

In 1998, the Wright Amendment issue resurfaced when Fort Worth and American Airlines sued Dallas, Continental Airlines, Continental Express, and Legend Airlines for supporting the Shelby Amendment, which lifted Wright Amendment restrictions on flights to Alabama, Kansas, and Mississippi. On , Legend countersued Fort Worth, accusing the city of a "double standard" in its simultaneous support for Alliance and opposition to expansion at Love. Lead Fort Worth attorney Lee Kelly contested the accusations, saying that "neither passenger service, nor any other service, believed to be competitive with the services or interests of [DFW] currently exists [at Alliance]," while Fort Worth mayor Kenneth Barr dismissed attacks on the all-cargo airport as "a bunch of nonsense." On , State District Judge Bob McCoy dismissed the lawsuit on the grounds that Legend was not a party to the 1968 DFW bond agreement and thus lacked standing to sue.

Alliance stood in for Los Angeles International Airport during the filming of the pilot episode of the short-lived 2004 TV drama LAX.

A  million runway and taxiway extension project was completed in April 2018 to allow heavily loaded cargo aircraft to take off from either runway in hot and high Texas summer weather conditions and reach Europe unrefueled. The project had been under construction since 2003 and required the relocation of nearby sections of Farm to Market Road 156 and a BNSF Railway line.

In December, 2022, the airport name was changed to Perot Field Fort Worth Alliance Airport in honor of Ross Perot, Sr.

Facilities and aircraft 

For the year ending  the airport had 112,326 aircraft operations, averaging 308 per day: 75% general aviation, 7% air carrier, 13% military, and 5% air taxi.  there were 22 aircraft based at this airport: 1 single-engine, 5 multi-engine, 8 jet and 8 helicopter.

Cargo airlines and destinations

Major tenants

American Airlines was previously the largest tenant at the airport, operating a major maintenance base which closed in December 2012 as part of AMR's Chapter 11 reorganization. Current major tenants include:
 Amazon Air (new hub opened on )
 BNSF Railway (Alliance intermodal facility)
 Bell Helicopter Textron (customer acceptance center)
 Drug Enforcement Administration (aviation operations center)
 DynCorp International (main operations center)
 FedEx (southwest regional sorting hub; FedEx also operates from Dallas/Fort Worth International Airport's east cargo facility)
 GDC Technics (aircraft modification company currently occupying the ex-American Airlines facility)
Tarrant County College – Aviation Learning Center (2014)
Gulfstream Aerospace(Maintenance Service Center)

Accidents and incidents 
 : A student pilot in a Cessna 150, registration number N67816, became lost during a nighttime solo cross-country flight and initiated an emergency landing at Alliance when the aircraft began losing power; the aircraft struck power lines and a tree on approach, causing substantial aircraft damage and minor injuries. The accident was attributed to fuel exhaustion caused by the pilot's failure to refuel the aircraft during an earlier intermediate stop; a factor was the pilot's inadvertent disorientation.
 : A Piper PA-32, registration number N8355L, was on approach when propeller RPM suddenly increased and engine instruments indicated zero oil pressure. The aircraft lost power and was substantially damaged during the subsequent off-airport forced landing; one pilot suffered serious injuries, while a second pilot and two passengers suffered minor injuries. The accident was attributed to "the improper installation of the oil filter bypass valve by an unknown person, which resulted in the loss of engine oil and subsequent loss of total power during a normal descent. A contributing factor to the accident was the lack of suitable terrain for the forced landing."
 : The owner-pilot and a flight instructor in a Eurocopter AS350 Écureuil, registration number N747CH, lost yaw control during low-altitude practice maneuvers with the hydraulic assist for the flight controls switched off. The aircraft crashed, rolled onto its side, and caught fire, and all three occupants suffered minor injuries. Investigators found that the manufacturer advised against attempting low-altitude, low-speed maneuvers without hydraulic assistance, as the aircraft could become very difficult to control. The accident was attributed to "The pilot's loss of control due to his not maintaining adequate airspeed and altitude during a simulated hydraulic flight control failure. Contributing to the accident was the flight instructor's inadequate supervision and delayed remedial response."

See also 
 List of airports in Texas

References

External links 
 
 Alliance Air Services
 

1989 establishments in Texas
Airports established in 1989
Airports in Fort Worth, Texas
Airports in Tarrant County, Texas
Airports in Texas
Economy of Fort Worth, Texas